Danny & the Juniors are an American doo-wop and rock and roll vocal group from Philadelphia, Pennsylvania originally consisting of Danny Rapp, Dave White, Frank Maffei and Joe Terranova. Formed in 1955, they are most widely recognized for their 1957 hit single "At the Hop".

1950s
Danny Rapp (lead), Frank Maffei (2nd tenor), Joe Terranova (baritone) (aka Joe Terry), and Dave White Tricker (first tenor) (aka Dave White) met at John Bartram High School and started singing together in the mid 1950s. Known as the Juvenaires at the time, they sang at school parties and other local events. Local record producer John Madara, took notice of them and introduced them to local DJs Larry Brown and Artie Singer, who had a record label known as Singular Records. In 1957, they recorded a John Madara and Dave White penned song "Do the Bop", recording the song as Johnny Madara and The Juvenaires. Singer took it to a fellow DJ named Dick Clark. Clark liked it and suggested changing their name to the Juniors and renaming their song. The song was recorded as "At The Hop', this time with Danny Rapp on the lead vocal. Changing "Let's all do the Bop" to "Let's go to the Hop" proved to be successful, and it became a local hit in June 1957. In December 1957, they received a call from Dick Clark to be a last-minute substitution for a no-show band on American Bandstand, and they performed it for a national audience. The song became a nationwide hit after ABC Paramount bought the master recording and issued it in January 1958. They soon appeared on The Pat Boone Chevy Showroom and other national TV shows. Soon after, they recorded  "Rock and Roll Is Here To Stay" and "Dottie", both of which charted. In the fall of 1957, David began attending Temple University and was on the Gym Team, but quit school when the group started making personal appearances.

1960s
In 1960, the band was signed to Dick Clark's Swan Records label, and they released one more record, "Twistin' USA". It made it into the Top 40, and became their final hit single. They went on to release several more singles, but were not able to repeat their earlier successes.

White left the group sometime near the end of the band’s recording career in the early 1960s to concentrate on writing and production. He was very successful in this venture, composing a number of hits, including "You Don't Own Me" for Lesley Gore, and "1-2-3" and "Like a Baby" for Len Barry.

Through the rest of the 1960s, the Juniors also appeared on Guyden Records, Mercury Records, and Luv Records (a subsidiary of Bell Records), where they re-recorded "Rock 'n' Roll Is Here To Stay" in 1968. In 1973, they re-recorded "At The Hop" for Crunch Records, which was owned by the same company that owned their ABC-Paramount Records master recordings.

1970s to the present
In 1976, "At the Hop" was re-issued, and it made its way into the Top 40 of the UK Singles Chart. The single was commercially used for the Canadian National Exhibition, changing the words to "Let's go to the Ex" rather than "Let's go to the hop." It was parodied by the band Dash Rip Rock with their single entitled "Let's Go Smoke Some Pot", and by NRBQ during the 1973 energy crisis under the title, "Get That Gasoline".

Rapp was found dead in a hotel in Arizona on April 5, 1983, of an apparent suicide.

Danny & the Juniors, featuring Joe Terry, continued to tour, with Terranova singing lead, along with Maffei and Maffei's brother, Bobby Maffei. They appeared at music festivals in England following release of their Swan recordings by Rollercoaster Records, who had acquired the original master tapes.   From September 2011, Frank Maffei and Terranova presented an hour-long rock'n'roll radio special for London's Covent Garden Radio in the UK.

Personnel deaths and recording losses
David White died on March 16, 2019, at the age of 79.    Joe Terranova died on April 15, 2019 at age 78.

Members
 Danny Rapp (born Daniel Earl Rapp, May 9, 1941, Philadelphia – died April 5, 1983) — lead vocalist
 Joe Terry (born Joseph Terranova, January 30, 1941, Philadelphia – died April 15, 2019) — lead/baritone vocalist
 Dave White (born David Ernest White, November 26, 1939, Philadelphia - died March 16, 2019) — first tenor vocalist
 Frank Maffei (born December 15, 1939, Philadelphia) — baritone/second tenor vocalist
 Bobby Maffei (born December 14, 1940, Philadelphia) — first tenor vocalist

Awards and recognition
Danny & the Juniors were inducted into The Vocal Group Hall of Fame in 2003, and the group was inducted into the Broadcast Pioneers of Philadelphia Hall of Fame on November 22, 2013.

Singles

Albums
Despite the sizable output released by Danny & The Juniors from the late 1950s to early 1960s, no albums were ever released during that time.  The first compilation album was released in 1983: Rockin' With Danny and The Juniors on MCA; this was followed over the years by several other compilations on vinyl and CD.

References

External links
Danny & The Juniors Official Website
The Vocal Group Hall of Fame: Danny and the Juniors
 

Doo-wop groups
Musical groups established in 1955
Rock music groups from Pennsylvania
Musical groups from Philadelphia
Swan Records artists
Rock and roll music groups
1955 establishments in Pennsylvania
Sibling musical groups